Sir Henry Bernard Eder KC (born 16 October 1952 in Malta), styled The Hon. Sir Bernard Eder, is an English barrister and a former High Court Judge, 2011–2015.

Early life and education
Eder was born in Malta and came to England in 1958. He was educated at The Haberdashers' Aske's Boys' School and Downing College at the University of Cambridge (BA, 1974). He is the older brother of Andrew Eder, foundation dean and emeritus professor of restorative dentistry at the University of Buckingham Dental Institute, honorary consultant in restorative dentistry at Milton Keynes University Hospital, NHS Foundation Trust, and Emeritus Professor of Restorative Dentistry and Dental Education at the UCL Eastman Dental Institute.

Legal career

Eder was called to the bar at Inner Temple in 1975 and became a member of 4 Essex Court (thereafter renamed Essex Court Chambers) specialising in commercial litigation and international arbitration.

He was appointed a QC in 1990, recorder from 2000 to 2001, and judge of the High Court of Justice of England and Wales (Queen's Bench Division) in 2011 where he regularly sat in the Commercial Court and also from time to time in the Queen's Bench Division, the Administrative Court and in the Court of Appeal Criminal Division until his resignation on 1 April 2015. On 7 May 2015, Eder was appointed a non-permanent International Judge at the Singapore International Commercial Court and continues to sit. In June 2016, he was appointed as a temporary Acting Judge in the Eastern Caribbean Supreme Court assigned to the Commercial Division in the British Virgin Islands. He regularly delivers lectures/speeches in the UK and in other parts of the world.

He was formerly Visiting Professor at University College London (1999–2003) where he gave a series of lectures on shipping law as part of the LLM course. He is now a member of the Institute of Maritime Law, University of Southampton, and continues to give lectures on a wide range of legal topics at universities in England and around the world.

He was the previous Senior Editor of ''Scrutton on Charterparties and Bills of Lading.

He is now a full-time arbitrator at 24, Lincoln's Inn Fields, London.

See also
Downing College, Cambridge
 www.bernardeder.com

References

1952 births
Living people
People educated at Haberdashers' Boys' School
Alumni of Downing College, Cambridge
Members of the Inner Temple
Queen's Bench Division judges
Place of birth missing (living people)
Knights Bachelor